Georgi Nikolov Denev (born 18 April 1950) is a former Bulgarian football player and manager. Denev made 49 appearances and scored 10 goals for the Bulgaria national football team from 1970 to 1979. He also played at the 1974 FIFA World Cup.

Honours

CSKA Sofia
Bulgarian A Group (5): 1970–71, 1971–72, 1972–73, 1974–75, 1975–76
Bulgarian Cup (3): 1972, 1973, 1974

References

1950 births
Living people
1974 FIFA World Cup players
Bulgaria international footballers
People from Lovech
Bulgarian expatriate footballers
Bulgarian football managers
PFC Litex Lovech managers
Bulgarian footballers
PFC Litex Lovech players
PFC Spartak Pleven players
PFC CSKA Sofia players
Ethnikos Piraeus F.C. players
Aris Limassol FC players
First Professional Football League (Bulgaria) players
Super League Greece players
Cypriot First Division players
Expatriate footballers in Greece
Expatriate footballers in Cyprus
Bulgarian expatriate sportspeople in Cyprus
Association football midfielders
Bulgarian expatriate sportspeople in Greece